Parliamentary elections were held in Austria on 9 November 1930. The Social Democratic Workers' Party emerged as the largest faction in the National Council, with 72 of the 165 seats, but the Christian Social Party (with 66 seats) formed a new coalition government with Otto Ender as Chancellor.  Voter turnout was 90%.

This was the  last parliamentary election to take place in the period of the First Austrian Republic. A series of socialist-fascist clashes in 1934 was followed by the authoritarian Federal State of Austria and eventual Anschluss in 1938 with Nazi Germany.

Results

Results by province

References

Austria
Legislative
Elections in Austria
Austria